Tom's Midnight Garden is a 1999 family fantasy film directed by Willard Carroll and starring Nigel Le Vaillant, Marlene Sidaway and Serena Gordon. The screenplay (by Willard Carroll) concerns a boy who discovers a secret garden. The film was based on the novel Tom's Midnight Garden by Philippa Pearce, and filmed at Chenies Manor House in Buckinghamshire. The film was produced by Hyperion Pictures.

Premise
After going to stay with his uncle a boy is disappointed that he doesn't have a garden he can play in. However, he discovers a secret garden that only appears in the middle of the night.

Plot
When Tom Long's brother Peter gets measles he is sent to stay with his Uncle Alan and Aunt Gwen in a flat with no garden. An elderly and reclusive landlady, Mrs Bartholomew, lives upstairs. Because he may be infectious he is not allowed out to play, and feels lonely. Without exercise he is less sleepy at night and when he hears the communal grandfather clock strangely strike 13, he investigates and finds the small back yard is now a large sunlit garden. Here he meets another lonely child called Hatty, who seems to be the only one who can see him. They have adventures which he gradually realises are taking place in the 19th century. Each night when Tom visits, Hatty is slightly older and Tom begins to wonder about the nature of time and reality. In an attempt to discover what's going on Tom asks Hattie to leave her skates in a hidden place. When he goes back into the future he manages to find them.
One night Hatty and Tom go out skating however Hatty begins to fall in love with a boy from her own time named Barty and Tom finds he is invisible to her. The next night Tom is unable to find the garden, running into rubbish bins from the modern day instead.
Just before Tom returns home he meets Mrs Bartholomew, who is revealed to be the elderly Hatty.

Cast
 Nigel Le Vaillant ... Thomas Long (adult)
 Marlene Sidaway ... Doris Schuster
 Serena Gordon ... Melody Long
 Alfie Lawrence ... Harriet Long
 Mel Martin ... Alice Long
 Greta Scacchi ... Aunt Gwen Kitson
 James Wilby ... Uncle Alan Kitson
 Anthony Way ... Tom Long
 Nick Robinson ... Peter Long
 Liz Smith ... Mrs. Willows
 Arlene Cockburn ... Susan the Maid
 Tom Bowles ... Mr. Ferguson
 Joan Plowright ... Mrs. Bartholomew (old Hatty)
 David Bradley ... Abel
 Stuart Piper ... Hubert
 Guy Witcher ... Edgar
 Rory Jennings ... James (12 years)
 Florence Hoath ... Hatty (12/13 years)
 Penelope Wilton ... Aunt Melbourne
 Laurel Melsom ... Youngest Hatty
 Noah Huntley ... James (20 years)
 Caroline Carver ... Hatty (young woman)
 Daniel Betts ... Barty
 Robert Putt ... Tower Keeper
 Arthur Cox ... Mr. Batsford

References

External links
 

1999 films
American fantasy films
British fantasy films
Films directed by Willard Carroll
Films set in the 19th century
Films set in the Victorian era
Films shot at Pinewood Studios
Films about time travel
Films with screenplays by Willard Carroll
Hyperion Pictures films
1990s English-language films
1990s American films
1990s British films